Stenotrachelus is a genus of false longhorn beetles in the family Stenotrachelidae. There is one described species in Stenotrachelus, S. aeneus.

References

Further reading

 

Tenebrionoidea
Articles created by Qbugbot